Bridgnorth Rugby Club is an English rugby union club based in Bridgnorth, Shropshire. The first XV team currently play in Midlands Premier, having reached the national levels of the sport for the first time in 2016 following back-to-back promotions.

Honours
 North Midlands 1 champions: 1998–99
 Midlands 3 West (North) champions 2000–01
 Midlands 3 West (north v south) promotion play-off winners: 2005–06
 Midlands 2 West (North) champions 2014–15
 Midlands 1 West champions 2015–16
 North Midlands Plate winners (2): 2017, 2018
 North Midlands Cup winners: 2019

References

Bridgnorth
English rugby union teams
Rugby union in Shropshire
Sports clubs in England